The men's 4 x 7.5 kilometre biathlon relay competition at the 1988 Winter Olympics 23 February, at Canmore Nordic Centre. Each national team consisted of four members, with each skiing 7.5 kilometres and shooting twice, once prone and once standing.

At each shooting station, a competitor has eight shots to hit five targets; however, only five bullets are loaded in a magazine at one – if additional shots are required, the spare bullets must be loaded one at a time. If after the eight shots are taken, there are still targets not yet hit, the competitor must ski a 150-metre penalty loop.

Summary 

The East German team were defending world champions, and had won at least a silver medal in every major competition of the 80s except for the 1984 Olympic race. In Calgary, they again failed to medal, missing three early shots to fall well behind. With the East Germans in trouble, the Soviets were able to pull away and win by more than a minute. This was the sixth consecutive relay win for the Soviet Union, and with the country dissolving before the 1992 Games, this win ensured that the Soviet Union never lost an Olympic relay. West Germany and Italy, the two teams that claimed bronze medals behind the top two teams at the 1986 and 1987 World Championships, rounded out the medals in Calgary.

Results

References

External links
IBU Biathlon Datacenter – 1988 Olympics Relay

Relay